Saint Mary's Chapel, also known as Saint Mary's Episcopal Church, is a historic Episcopal church located on Rushmore Avenue between Roslyn Avenue and Glen Cove Avenue in Carle Place, Nassau County, New York. It was built in 1926, and is a one-story, rectangular, Tudor Revival style church building.  It has a steeply pitched gable roof and low eaves.  It features half-timbering on the stucco exterior and a small projecting vestibule.

It was added to the National Register of Historic Places in 2005.

References

External links 
Official website

Episcopal church buildings in New York (state)
Churches on the National Register of Historic Places in New York (state)
Tudor Revival architecture in New York (state)
Churches completed in 1926
20th-century Episcopal church buildings
Churches in Nassau County, New York
National Register of Historic Places in Nassau County, New York